Nota or NOTA may refer to:

Music
Nóta, a form of 19th century Hungarian popular song 
Lai (poetic form) or nota, a medieval musical form
Nota (group), a Puerto Rican vocal group

NOTA
None of the above, a ballot choice in some jurisdictions or organizations
For which is named the None of the Above Direct Democracy Party, a minor political party in Ontario
Network on Terminal Architecture, a mobile technology system architecture
NAP of the Americas, a large data center and Internet exchange point in Miami, Florida
National Organ Transplant Act of 1984, American legislation

People
Július Nôta (1971–2009), Slovak footballer
Marc Nota (born 1965), Dutch former cricketer and coach
Nota Schiller (born 1937), Orthodox Jewish rabbi and rosh yeshiva

Other uses
Nota, an Australian automobile manufacturer
Note (film), 2015 Malaysian Film often known as NOTA in Malay language
NOTA (film), a 2018 Tamil film
Nota (library), Danish library for people with print disabilities

See also
Notah Begay III (born 1972), American golfer